The 1999 season was Molde's 24th season in the top flight of Norwegian football. This season Molde competed in Tippeligaen, the Norwegian Cup and the UEFA Champions League.

In Tippeligaen, Molde finished in 2nd position, 6 points behind winners Rosenborg.

Molde participated in the 2000 Norwegian Cup. They defeated Spjelkavik, Sunndal, Strindheim, Kjelsås  on their way to the quarterfinal where they defeated Lillestrøm with 3–0 at home. On 3 October 2000, Molde lost the semifinal vs. Brann at home with the score 3–4 after extra time.

In the UEFA Champions League, Molde was drawn against Russian team CSKA Moscow in the second qualifying round. Molde lost the first leg at away ground with the score 0–2. Molde won the second leg 4–0 at home and advanced to the next round 4–2 on aggregate. In the third and last qualifying round, Molde was drawn against Spanish team Mallorca. The teams played 0–0 in the first leg in Molde. In the second leg, Molde was one goal behind for more than one hour after Jovan Stanković' penalty goal in the 21st minute. In the 84th minute, Andreas Lund scored the equaliser from a penalty kick after Fernando Niño's handball. Niño was sent off in the situation which led to the penalty. The game ended with a 1–1 draw which sent Molde through to the Champions League group stage for the first time in the club's history. The second leg against Mallorca has since often been referred to as Miracle on Mallorca.

Squad

As of end of season.

Friendlies

Competitions

Tippeligaen

Results summary

Results by round

Results

League table

Norwegian Cup

UEFA Champions League

Qualifying rounds

Group stage

Squad statistics
The statistics include competitive matches only.

Appearances and goals

|-
|colspan="14"|Players away from Molde on loan:
|-
|colspan="14"|Players who left Molde during the season:

 
|}

Goalscorers

See also
Molde FK seasons

References

External links
nifs.no

1999
Molde